The Oratorio di San Giuseppe dei Falegnami is a Baroque chapel or prayer room located across the Via Giuseppe d'Alessi from the church of San Giuseppe dei Teatini in the quarter of the Albergaria, within the historic centre of Palermo, region of Sicily, Italy.

History 
The oratory was founded in 1603, and is now located in the building housing the law (giurisprudenza) faculty of the Università di Palermo. The interiors are decorated with both woodwork and stuccoes by Giuseppe Serpotta. Some frescoes painted by Pietro Novelli were transferred to the regional art museum at the Palazzo Abatellis. The remaining frescoes were painted in the late 18th-century. The wooden tableuxs with episodes of the life of Christ were completed by Baldassare Pampilonia.

References 

 Giuseppe
Baroque architecture in Palermo
17th-century Roman Catholic church buildings in Italy